The year 1984 in archaeology involved some significant events.

Explorations
 Ian Graham makes first scientific examination and map of Maya site of Cival.

Excavations
 Hengistbury Head, by Barry Cunliffe, is completed (begun in 1979).
 Khok Phanom Di, by Charles Higham (1984–85).
 July - Uluburun shipwreck, by the Institute of Nautical Archaeology under George Bass, begun (continues until 1994).

Publications

Finds
 July - Pirate ship Whydah Gally (wrecked off Cape Cod in 1717) discovery announced.
 August 1 - Lindow Man is found in Lindow Moss in north west England by peat cutters.
 September - 1928 Scania truck (sunk 1936) located in Fryken, Sweden.
 November - Commerce raider CSS Alabama (sunk off Cherbourg peninsula in 1864) is found by the French Navy.
 Turkana Boy is found in Kenya by team led by Richard Leakey.

Awards

Events
 April - Jorvik Viking Centre opens in York, England.

Births

Deaths
 April 5: Giuseppe Tucci, Italian Orientalist (born 1894)

References

Archaeology
Archaeology
Archaeology by year